Crestwood School District is a school district in Michigan. Its headquarters are in Dearborn Heights.

By 2016 the Arab American student population was increasing due to an influx of Arabs into Dearborn Heights. Today in 2018 60% of the students are Arab.

History
In 2013 the Equal Employment Opportunity Commission ruled that the district had discriminated against Arab Americans and other minority groups while determining which people should be added as staff members, which made it out of compliance with the Civil Rights Act.

Schools
 Crestwood High School
 Riverside Middle School
 Highview Elementary School
 Hillcrest Elementary School
 Kinloch Elementary School

References

External links

 

Dearborn Heights, Michigan
School districts in Michigan
Education in Wayne County, Michigan